Simon Mazière (1649 - 1722) was a French sculptor, most notable for several sculptures in the parc du château de Versailles. He was born in Pontoise.

17th-century French sculptors
18th-century French sculptors
People from Pontoise
1649 births
1722 deaths
French Baroque sculptors